"Chicago" is a song by American recording artist Michael Jackson. The song was originally written by Cory Rooney under the title "She Was Loving Me". Jackson recorded the track at The Hit Factory recording studio in New York City during the Invincible album sessions between late March and mid-April 1999. 

The track was ultimately not selected for Invincible and remained unreleased and unheard by the public for 15 years. Following Jackson's death, Rooney collaborated with his nephew, Taryll Jackson, on a new production in 2010.

In 2014, the track was reworked yet again, this time by producer Timbaland. The Timbaland version of the track was ultimately included on Jackson's second posthumous album, Xscape, under the title "Chicago". Nine months before Xscape was officially released, Timbaland sparked rumours that "Chicago" was going to be the project's lead single. However, that wouldn't end up being the case, with "Love Never Felt So Good" going on to be the lead single instead.

Release
The song was released on May 5, 2014 on Sony Entertainment Network as a promotional single for promoting Xscape.

Papercha$er Remix
The song's "Papercha$er Remix" was made available for select Sony customers through Xperia Lounge and Music Unlimited as Track 9 of the standard edition.

Charts

See also
 List of unreleased Michael Jackson material
 Death of Michael Jackson

References

2014 songs
Michael Jackson songs
Song recordings produced by Michael Jackson
Song recordings produced by Cory Rooney
Song recordings produced by Timbaland
Song recordings produced by Jerome "J-Roc" Harmon
Songs about Chicago
Songs written by Cory Rooney
Songs released posthumously